Harford Fountain, is a 19th-century grade II listed fountain in Harford Square, in Lampeter, Ceredigion.

History

The Fountain was built in 1862, restored in 1990 and listed in 1992. It is made of grey Forest of Dean stone. It is an obelisk on a panelled pedestal base. There are iron Spigots one each side, which are mounted on wrought-iron cruciform supports, that have brass fox-mask mouths. There are shields each side, one with carved Harford Arms. The inscription records that the fountain was a gift from J S Harford of Peterwell. The Harford family lived at the Falcondale Estate, on the outskirts of Lampeter. The fountain provided the first drinking water for the people in the town

References

Fountains in the United Kingdom